Zidane Sam (born 24 July 1998) is a Vincentian professional footballer who plays for JeBelle and the Saint Vincent and the Grenadines national team.

Club career
Sam was the top scorer of the 2019–20 SVGFF Premier Division season with Greggs FC, scoring 21 league goals. However, the team was relegated to the SVGFF First Division at the end of the year.

International career
He debuted internationally on 25 March 2021 in a 2022 FIFA World Cup qualifying match against Curaçao, replacing Kamol Bess in the 5–0 defeat.

On 30 March 2021, Sam scored his first goal for Saint Vincent and the Grenadines against the British Virgin Islands in a 3–0 victory.

Honours

Individual
 SVGFF Premier Division top scorer: 2019–20

References

External links
 
 

1998 births
Living people
Saint Vincent and the Grenadines footballers
Saint Vincent and the Grenadines international footballers
Association football forwards